Ana Gabriela Esmeralda Diaz Molina (born 7 June 1977, in Västerås) is a Swedish musician, composer, and producer.

Biography 
Ana Diaz grew up with a Finnish-born mother and a Venezuelan father in Bäckby, Västerås, where she early developed her interest in music. She attended music class at the Fryxellska school in Västerås. Ana's grandparents are from the Málaga province in Spain and lived as touring musicians and composers, including in Cuba together with legends such as Benny Gooman and Louis Armstrong.

In 2000, Diaz moved to the United States. After many years in Seattle and Detroit, she returned to Stockholm for a shorter period in 2004. There she studied music production in 2004–05 at Kulturama school and also participated in 2007 as an artist with the song "Waiting for Ben" on DN På stan's CD Pophopp 2007. Between 2007 and 2009, Diaz lived in Australia. After a period of much searching, odd jobs, and dealing with depression, Diaz decided to study to become a dentist. Days before she was to start studying, she was contracted as songwriter for the music publisher Sony/ATV Music Publishing. Diaz dropped out and began an intensive period as an international songwriter, in Stockholm, Nashville, London, Tokyo and Los Angeles.

Ana Diaz has collaborated with and written songs for foreign artists such as Britney Spears, One Direction, Christina Grimmie, Wyclef Jean, Markus Schultz, David Guetta, Sounwave, Rami Yacoub, Fred Ball, Jennifer Lopez, William Orbit, Astrid S, Alexandra Burke, Exo and Swedish artists such as Andreas Kleerup, Loreen, Agnes, Zara Larsson, Sabina Ddumba, Daniel Adams-Ray, Petra Marklund, Marcus Price, Oskar Linnros and Petter.

She has also written music for film and in 2015 was nominated for Roy for "Best music for commercials". Then for the song "Business like a Swede" where Ana appears rapping in English. Ana has also composed music for commercials for Vision, Volvo and Harman Kardon. Ana was one of the songwriters behind the song "Carry on" for one of Volvo's commercials with Sabina Ddumba and Andreas Kleerup . In 2018, she was part of the team behind the music for the movie Halvdan Viking, winning a Guldbagge Awards for "Best original score".

In 2015, Diaz moved back to Sweden from London after nearly 15 years abroad. After having struggled for years with anxiety, depression, she decided to pursue her own artist career with songs written for the first time in Swedish.

The single "Fill my glass now" was released on October 30, 2015. "Stronger", the second single, was released on January 25, 2016. The debut EP Lyssna del 1 was released on February 3, 2016 on their own label WINWIN Recordings with license agreement to Sony Music.  On October 21, 2016, the EP Lyssna del 2 was released. In 2016, Ana Diaz collaborated with artist Abidaz on his album "Respektera hungern", on the song "Ghettofåglar".

Lyssna del 1 and Lyssna del 2 were met by very positive reviews and Ana was nominated for the  music award in the category "Newcomer of the Year" and Grammis in the categories "Composer of the Year" and "Newcomer of the Year". Ana toured Sweden around the Way Out West festival and Popaganda.

In 2017 Neon Gold released the debut EP "EP1" with the project Snow Culture, a duo consisting of Ana Diaz and Oskar Sikow. Snow Culture was well received in American press and the music was synced to series on both Netflix and HBO.

In 2017, Ana participated in SVT's program Jills veranda.  In Ana's section, topics such as mental health, sensitivity and creativity were dealt openly.

In 2017, Oskar Linnros released the song "Wifi remix", where he was guest by Ana Diaz and Jireel .

In 2018, Petter released the song "Ikväll" feat. Ana Diaz

In 2018, Ana was the artist in the music documentary Harman Kardon Reflections, where viewers could follow Ana's collaboration with producer J.Views. In the films, the two musicians traveled around in a Volvo XC40 to 3 cities in Europe (Amsterdam, Berlin and Stockholm) to explore music and the cultural scene in parallel with composing one song per city.

In 2018, Ana collaborated with Gaute Storaas and wrote music for the film Halvdan Viking. On 3 January 2019, it was announced that the film music had become Guldbagge-nominated.

In 2020, Ana was cast for the 11th season of the Swedish TV show Så mycket bättre, during the first week she performed a cover of "Vår lilla stad" by Eldkvarn.

Discography

Albums

Singles

Other charted songs

Notes

References

External links 

 
 

Swedish songwriters
Swedish pop singers
Swedish people of Spanish descent
Swedish people of Finnish descent
Living people
People from Västerås
1977 births